Bopomofo is a Unicode block containing phonetic characters for Chinese. The original set of 40 Bopomofo characters is based on the Chinese standard GB 2312. Additional Bopomofo characters can be found in the Bopomofo Extended block.

Block

History
The following Unicode-related documents record the purpose and process of defining specific characters in the Bopomofo block:

See also 
 Spacing Modifier Letters (Unicode block) has two Bopomofo characters: U+02EA–U+02EB

References 

Unicode blocks